Zwierzyniec is one of 18 districts of Kraków, located in the western part of the city. The name Zwierzyniec comes from a village of same name that is now a part of the district. 

Subdivisions of Zwierzyniec 
Zwierzyniec is divided into smaller subdivisions (osiedles). Here's a list of them.
 Bielany
 Chełm
 Olszanica
 Półwsie Zwierzynieckie
 Przegorzały
 Salwator
 Wola Justowska
 Zwierzyniec
 Zakamycze

Population

References

External links
 Official website of Rada Dzielnicy Zwierzyniec
 Biuletyn Informacji Publicznej
 Official website of Zwierzyniec

Districts of Kraków